Debiganj Alodini Govt. Girls' High School is a girls high school in Debiganj, Debiganj Upazila, Panchagarh District, Bangladesh. Secondary School Certificate examination under Dinajpur Education Board.

References

Schools in Panchagarh District
Dinajpur Education Board
Girls' schools in Bangladesh